Ahmad Zarruq also known as Imam az-Zarrūq ash Shadhili (Aḥmad ibn Aḥmad ibn Muḥammad ibn ‘Īsa) (1442–1493 CE) was a 15th-century Moroccan Shadhili Sufi, jurist and saint from Fes. He is considered one of the most prominent and accomplished legal, theoretical, and spiritual scholars in Islamic history, and is thought by some to have been the renewer of his time (mujaddid). He was also the first to be given the honorific title "Regulator of the Scholars and Saints" (muhtasib al-‘ulama’ wa al-awliya’). His shrine is located in Misrata, Libya, however unknown militants exhumed the grave and burnt half the mosque.

Life
Zarruq was born on 7 June 1442 (22nd Muharram, 846 of the Islamic 'Hijra' calendar) - according to Sheikh Abd Allah Gannun - in a village in the region of Tiliwan, a mountain area of Morocco. He was an Berber of the tribe of the Barnusi who lived in an area between Fes and Taza, and was orphaned of both his mother and father within the first seven days of his birth. His grandmother, an accomplished jurist, raised him and was his first teacher.
Zarruq is one of the most prominent scholars in the late Maliki school but is perhaps better known as a Shadhili Sufi Sheikh and founder of the Zarruqiyye branch of the Shadhili Sufi order (Tariqa). He was a contemporary of Muhammad al-Jazuli.

He took the name 'Zarruq' (meaning 'blue') and he studied the traditional Islamic sciences such as jurisprudence, Arabic, traditions of Prophet Muhammed and wrote extensively on a number of subjects.  His most famous works are first of all his Qawa’id al-Tasawwuf (The Principles of Sufism), his commentaries on Maliki jurisprudence and his commentary upon the Hikam of ibn 'Ata Allah. He travelled East to Mecca in Tihamah and to Egypt before taking up residence in Misrata, Libya where he died in 899 (1493). He was buried in Misrata, Libya.

Anecdotes of Zarruq's childhood, travels and education appear in an untitled fahrasa and Fawa'id min Kunnash, the second being edited in its Arabic version. Selected passages appear in translation in: Zarruq the Sufi: a Guide in the Way and a Leader to the Truth by Ali Fahmi Khushaim (Tripoli, Libya:General Company for Publication, 1976)

Quotes 

 This world is like the river of Goliath from which no one who drinks is saved except the one who scoops up a handful, not the one who slakes his thirst.

See also
 Wazifa Zarruqiyya
 List of Ash'aris and Maturidis

Notes

Bibliography
Scott Alan Kugle, Rebel Between Spirit And Law: Ahmad Zarruq, Sainthood, And Authority in Islam, Indiana University Press, 2006, 
Ali Fahmi Khashim, Zarruq, the Sufi: A guide in the way and a leader to the truth : a biographical and critical study of a mystic from North Africa
 Salah Hussein Al-Houdalieh, "Visitation and Making Vows at the Shrine of Shaykh Shihab Al-Din,"  Journal of Islamic Studies, 21,3 (2010), 377-390.

External links
Zaineb S. Istrabadi, Qawa’id al-Tasawwuf, The Principles of Sufism, annotated translation with introduction, Phd thesis with extensive information on his life, times, contemporaries and interpretation of the text (pdf-file)  
Foundations of the spiritual path by Sidi Ahmad Zarruq, translated by Hamza Yusuf (pdf-file) 

1442 births
1493 deaths
Asharis
Moroccan autobiographers
Moroccan travel writers
Shadhili order
Moroccan Sufi writers
Moroccan Maliki scholars
15th-century Moroccan writers
People from Fez, Morocco
15th-century Berber people
Berber scholars
Berber writers
Moroccan Islamic religious leaders
15th-century jurists
Supporters of Ibn Arabi